Neogene is a genus of moths in the family Sphingidae erected by Walter Rothschild and Karl Jordan in 1903. They are of neotropical distribution.

Species
Neogene albescens Clark, 1929
Neogene carrerasi (Giacomelli, 1911)
Neogene corumbensis Clark, 1922
Neogene curitiba E. D. Jones, 1908
Neogene dynaeus (Hübner, 1927)
Neogene intermedia Clark, 1935
Neogene pictus Clark, 1931
Neogene reevei (Druce, 1882)
Neogene steinbachi Clark, 1924

References

 
Sphingini
Moth genera
Taxa named by Walter Rothschild
Taxa named by Karl Jordan